Apslawn is a rural locality in the local government area (LGA) of Glamorgan–Spring Bay in the South-east LGA region of Tasmania. The 2021 census recorded a population of 15 for the state suburb of Apslawn.

History 
Apslawn is a confirmed locality. The name comes from a property established here by John Lyne about 1833. 

Sir William Lyne, an Australian politician, came from this family.

Geography
The southern boundary follows the centreline of Moulting Lagoon, an inlet of Great Oyster Bay.

Road infrastructure 
Route A3 (Tasman Highway) runs through from west to east.

See also
 Moulting Lagoon Important Bird Area

References

Towns in Tasmania
Localities of Glamorgan–Spring Bay Council